The 1998 Toyota Grand Prix of Long Beach was the third round of the 1998 CART FedEx Champ Car World Series season, held on April 5, 1998, on the streets of Long Beach, California.  Alex Zanardi won the race, even though he was a lap down at one point.

This is the last Grand Prix of Long Beach to have Al Unser Jr and Bobby Rahal.

Classification

Race

Caution flags

Lap leaders

Point standings after race

References

Toyota Grand Prix